Keppel Constituency was a constituency represented in the Legislative Council of Singapore from 1951 until 1955. It elected one Legislative Council member. The constituency was held by Lim Yew Hock, leader of the Labour Party.

The constituency was formed from Municipal South-West Constituency in 1951. In 1955, the constituency was abolished and split into Havelock, Pasir Panjang, Queenstown, Southern Islands, Tanjong Pagar and Tiong Bahru constituencies.

Legislative Council member

Elections

Elections in the 1950s

References 

Singaporean electoral divisions